The acronym CREN may refer to:

 Christian Real Estate Network, a private real estate association
 Club de Radioexperimentadores de Nicaragua, an amateur radio organization in Nicaragua
 Corporation for Research and Educational Networking, organizational home for the computer networks Bitnet and later CSNET